n-Propyl azide is an organic compound with the formula CH3CH2CH2N3. A white solid, it is a simple organic azide.

n-Propyl azide has been used in the laboratory synthesis of pharmaceutical drug candidates.

References

Further reading
 

Organoazides
Propyl compounds